Simon Emmanuel Jimenez is a Filipino-American writer of speculative fiction. His novels include The Vanished Birds and The Spear Cuts Through Water. Jimenez's works have received critical praise, with his debut novel being nominated for the 2021 Locus Award for Best First Novel and the 2021 Arthur C. Clarke Award. Jimenez himself was nominated for the 2021 Astounding Award for Best New Writer.

Career

In an interview with Kirkus, Jimenez described himself as a "lifelong science fiction fan". Among his influences are the science fiction works The Hyperion Cantos by Dan Simmons, as well as the works of David Mitchell, Gabriel García Marquez, and Jennifer Egan.

During his time at Emerson College, he began working on his first novel. His debut novel, The Vanished Birds, was published in 2020. In 2021, Jimenez was nominated for the Astounding Award for Best New Writer.

Personal life

Jimenez spent time in Canada and the Philippines growing up. He attended Emerson College, where he earned an MFA in creative writing. Jimenez played the piano, and describes it as a "love/hate relationship".

Jimenez is gay and multiracial, being half Filipino. He currently lives in the United States.

Awards and honors
In 2022, Kirkus Reviews named The Spear Cuts Through Water one of the best science fiction and fantasy books of the year.

Bibliography

 The Vanished Birds, 2020. Titan Books. 
 The Spear Cuts Through Water, 2022. Del Rey Books.

References

American fantasy writers
American gay writers
American science fiction writers
American writers of Filipino descent
1989 births
Living people